This article lists embassies and consulates posted in Greece. There are currently 85 embassies in Athens. In addition, there is a diplomatic liaison office of the Palestinian Authority, which does not have the full embassy status. Many other countries have non resident embassies or honorary consulates.

Diplomatic missions in Athens

Embassies

Other posts and representative offices 
 (Representative Office)
 (Diplomatic Delegation)
 (Representative Office)
 (Taipei Representative Office)

Gallery

Consulates General / Consulates

Athens

Corfu
 (Vice-Consulate)

Thessaloniki

Heraklion
 (Vice-Consulate)

Ioannina

Komotini

Piraeus

Rhodes
 (Vice-Consulate)

Non-resident embassies accredited to Greece 

 Resident in Rome

 

 

   

 

Resident in Paris

 

    

Resident in London     

Resident in Geneva

  

Resident in Sofia

Resident in elsewhere
 (Cairo)
 (Holy See)
 (Budapest)
 (Brussels)
 (Madrid)
 (Holy See)
 (Bucharest)
 (Vienna)
 (Tel Aviv)
 (San Marino)

Former embassies

References

External links 
 Full list of diplomatic missions in Greece

See also 
 Visa requirements for Greek citizens

 
Diplomatic missions
Greece